Tapirus cristatellus is an extinct species of tapir from the Pleistocene of South America. Remains are known from Brazil, specifically the states of Minas Gerais and Bahia.

The now extinct tapirs of Pleistocene North America may have been derived from T. cristatellus.

References

Prehistoric tapirs
Pleistocene mammals of South America
Pleistocene odd-toed ungulates